Gephyroglanis habereri is a species of claroteid catfish endemic to Cameroon where it is only known from the Dja River.  This species grows to a length of 20.2 cm (8.0 inches) SL.

References 
 

Claroteidae
Freshwater fish of Cameroon
Endemic fauna of Cameroon
Fish described in 1912